The 2010 Golden Awards was an awards ceremony held in Malaysia. It is the inaugural ceremony and was held at the Putrajaya International Convention Centre in Putrajaya. The list of nominees was published in July and the ceremony took place in September. The show was hosted by 988 FM radio DJ Cheryl Lee and Singaporean host and actor Bryan Wong. A special episode called "Golden Awards Prelude" featuring the nominees from each category was aired on ntv7 during the weeks leading up to the ceremony.

Guest presenters and performers include Quan Yi Fong, Wu Jiahui, Nicholas Teo, Fish Leong, Jamii Szmadzinski, Sam Lee, Aarif Rahman and Godfrey Gao.

Professionally Judged Awards

Drama Category

Best Drama Serial 最佳电视剧
The Iron Lady (女头家)
Goodnight DJ (声空感应)
Romantic Delicacies (美食厨师男)
Age of Glory (情牵南苑)
Love 18 (逆风18)

Best Actor 最佳男主角
Steve Yap 叶良财 - Welcome Home, My Love (快乐一家)
Chen Huen Phuei 曾宏辉 - Goodnight DJ (声空感应)
Wee Kheng Ming 黄启铭 - The Thin Line (还我情真)
Melvin Sia 谢佳见 - Romantic Delicacies (美食厨师男)
Zzen Zhang 章缜翔 - The Thin Line (还我情真)

Best Actress 最佳女主角
Aenie Wong 王淑君 - The Iron Lady (女头家)
Debbie Goh 吴天瑜 - Age of Glory (情牵南苑)
Apple Hong 洪乙心 - Love is All Around (爱在你左右)
Yeo Yann Yann 杨雁雁 - The Iron Lady (女头家)
Jesseca Liu 刘芷绚 - Romantic Delicacies (美食厨师男)

Best Supporting Actor 最佳男配角
Alvin Wong 王骏 - Exclusive (独家追辑)
Ernest Chong 张顺源 - Exclusive (独家追辑)
Frederick Lee 李洺中 - Age of Glory (情牵南苑)
Jordan Voon 温绍平 - The Iron Lady (女头家)
William San 辛伟廉 - Lion.Hearts (谈谈情,舞舞狮)

Best Supporting Actress 最佳女配角
Seck Fook Yee 释福如 - The Iron Lady (女头家)
梁书造 - My Kampong Days (家在半山芭)
林亦廷 - My Kampong Days (家在半山芭)
Jane Ng 黃明慧 - The Thin Line (还我情真)
Stella Chung 钟晓玉 - The Thin Line (还我情真)

Best Newcomer 最佳新晋演员
Hishiko 吴佩其 - The Iron Lady (女头家)
Yise Loo 罗忆诗 - Goodnight DJ (声空感应)
Tracy Lee 李美玲 - The Thin Line (还我情真)
Jamie 朱健美 - Love is Not Blind (乐语思情)
Henley Hii 许亮宇 - Step of Dance (眉飛色舞)

Best Drama Theme Song 最佳电视剧主题曲
The Iron Lady (女头家)
Fallen Angel (天使的烙印)
Age of Glory (情牵南苑)
Love 18 (逆风18)
Exclusive (独家追辑)

Non-drama Category

Best Variety Programme
Deal or No Deal Malaysia (Chinese version) 一掷千金
Double Triple Or Nothing 贰叁零之役
Double Triple Or Nothing – Kids
Project Superstar Malaysia (Season 3) 绝对SuperStar 3
Ultimate Power Group (season 1) 终极天团

Best Reality Programme Host
Cheryl Lee 李欣怡 - Project Superstar Malaysia 3 (绝对Superstar)

Best Variety and Entertainment Programme
Double Triple Or Nothing

Best Variety and Entertainment Programme Host 最佳综艺娱乐节目主持人
Owen Yap 叶剑锋 - Deal Or No Deal (season 2) (一掷千金)

Awards Eligible for Audience Voting

Most Popular Actor
Chen Huen Phuei 曾宏辉
Steve Yap 叶良财
Zzen Zhang 章缜翔
Wee Kheng Ming 黄启铭
Huang Zhiqiang 黄志强
Melvin Sia 谢佳见
Shaun Chen 陈泓宇
Foo Chee Kin 傅志坚
Monday Kang 江伟翰
Jeffrey Cheng 庄惟翔
Henley Hii 许亮宇

Most Popular Actress
Yeo Yann Yann 杨雁雁
Jesseca Liu 刘芷绚
Debbie Goh 吴天瑜
Aenie Wong 王淑君
Apple Hong 洪乙心
Ong Ai Leng 王爱玲
Cai Peixuan 蔡佩璇
Yise Loo 罗忆诗
Hishiko 吴姵琪
Angie 萧佩莹
Tracy Lee 李美玲
Mayjune Tan 陈美君
Emily Lim 林佩琪
Jamie 朱健美

Most Popular Drama
The Iron Lady (女头家)

Most Popular TV Host/Presenter
Gary Yap 叶俊岑

Special awards

Lifetime Achievement Award 金视辉煌成就奖
Lai Meng 黎明

References

External links
Golden Awards 2010 - Pictures on malaysia.msn.com

2010 television awards
Events in Putrajaya